DC Universe All Star Games was an unscripted gaming series that premiered on the DC Universe streaming service on February 28, 2020. Created by Freddie Prinze Jr. and Sam Witwer, the first 6 episodes featured Prinze, Witwer, Vanessa Marshall, Clare Grant, and Xavier Woods playing the '80s role-playing game DC Heroes in a campaign reminiscent of the film The Breakfast Club. The series was directed by Jon Lee Brody.

References

External links

Comic book podcasts
DC Universe (streaming service) original programming
English-language television shows
Works based on DC Comics